KHXT (107.9 FM, "HOT 107.9") is a Rhythmic Top 40 radio station serving the Lafayette area. The Townsquare Media outlet broadcasts with an ERP of 97 kW and is licensed to Erath, Louisiana.  Its studios are located on Bertrand Road in Lafayette, and its transmitter is located north of St. Martinville, Louisiana. Every weekday from 6 AM to 10 AM, they host The Morning Buzz with Chris Reed and Digital, and Friday mornings from 6 AM to 10 AM, they play the Breakfast Jam, an all request mixshow that is a mix of old school hip hop and various other types of old school music. The station also hosts all Louisiana Ragin' Cajuns football games, men's basketball games, and women's basketball games.

History
The station originally debuted with a news/talk format at 107.7 as KPEL-FM in 1992, but by 1997 they would switch signals to 107.9 and format to classic rock as KRXZ. In 2000 it changed the calls to KRKA and in 2003 switched to its current format. In 2010, it changed the calls to KHXT.

External links
KHXT official website

Radio stations in Louisiana
Rhythmic contemporary radio stations in the United States
Radio stations established in 1992
1992 establishments in Louisiana
Townsquare Media radio stations